Krishnamachari Srinivasan (born 18 January 1966) is an Indian cricket umpire. He stood in twenty seven FC Cricket, twenty one List A and nine Twenty20 matches. Prior to being an umpire, he played four List A matches for Tamil Nadu.

References

1966 births
Living people
Indian cricket umpires
Cricketers from Chennai
Tamil Nadu cricketers